Lud's Church (sometimes written as Ludchurch) is a deep chasm penetrating the Millstone Grit bedrock created by a massive landslip on the hillside above Gradbach, Staffordshire, England. It is mossy and overgrown, wet and cool even on the hottest of days.

Geological origins
Lud's Church is formed within the thick bed of coarse Carboniferous sandstone known as the Roaches Grit which here dips northeastwards into the Goyt Syncline. The rocks of this area are traversed by numerous roughly northwest-to-southeast-oriented faults and fracture planes. In addition, weak layers of mudstone exist within the sequence. It is along such lines of weakness that a large mass of the Roaches Grit bounding the northeast side of the rift has slipped slightly downhill into the Dane Valley resulting in the open rift. The age of the movement is unknown but is likely to be post-glacial.

History

The area has a place in Christian history: the Lollards, who were followers of John Wycliffe, an early church reformer, are supposed to have used this as a secret place of worship during the early 15th century, when they were being persecuted for their religious beliefs. Lud's Church may have been named after Walter de Ludank or Walter de Lud-Auk who was captured here at one of their meetings.

A wooden ship's figurehead from the ship Swythamley formerly stood in a high niche above the chasm, placed there by Philip Brocklehurst, then the landowner, around 1862. It was called 'Lady Lud' and was supposed to commemorate the death of the daughter of a Lollard preacher.

A number of climbing routes up the sides of the chasm were pioneered during the 20th century, but climbing is now discouraged to protect the lower plants that have colonised the damp rockfaces.

In legend

Scholars spent many decades debating the dialect of the medieval poem Sir Gawain and the Green Knight. Shortly after they came to a consensus that the dialect was that of the North-West Midlands on the Staffordshire/Cheshire border, Lud’s Church in the Staffordshire Moorlands was suggested by R. W. V. Elliot as one of the key settings for the climax of the poem's story – "The Green Chapel" – in May 1958. Elliot went on to give a scholarly modern explication of most of the local landscape elements in a series of essays in scholarly journals. These various essays were later collected in his book in 1984.  His general claim that "The Green Chapel" must be somewhere in this district was supported by other scholarly work suggesting the location as Nan Tor cave, above the former railway station at Wetton Mill.

In fiction

Lud's Church is a location in Alan Garner's The Moon of Gomrath, the second book in the Weirdstone Trilogy.  It is also the central location in the book Dark Peak by Marcus Sedgwick, which references the Sir Gawain legend.

References

External links

Lud's Church at cressbrook.co.uk
Lud's Church at nothingtoseehere.net
How to Get to Lud's Church at dor.ky via archive.org

Caves of Staffordshire
Landforms of Staffordshire
Tourist attractions of the Peak District
Staffordshire Moorlands
Canyons and gorges of England